The following highways are numbered 901:

Costa Rica
 National Route 901

United States
Hawaii
  Hawaii Route 901
  Pennsylvania Route 901
Territories
  Puerto Rico Highway 901